GRL-0617 is a drug which is one of the first compounds discovered that acts as a selective small-molecule inhibitor of the protease enzyme papain-like protease (PLpro) found in some pathogenic viruses, including the coronavirus SARS-CoV-2. It has been shown to inhibit viral replication in silico  and in vitro.

See also 
 3CLpro-1
 Ebselen
 GC376

References 

Antiviral drugs
1-Naphthyl compounds
Anilines
Benzamides